Apollo Priyadarshanam Institute of Technology is a co-educational institution located in Chennai, Tamil Nadu, India offering diploma courses in engineering.

References

External links
 

Universities and colleges in Chennai
Colleges affiliated to Anna University
Educational institutions established in 2010
2010 establishments in Tamil Nadu